Novochesnokovka is a rural locality (a selo) in Zhilinsky Selsoviet, Pervomaysky District, Altai Krai, Russia. The population was 147 as of 2013. There are 8 streets.

Geography 
Novochesnokovka is located 48 km northeast of Novoaltaysk (the district's administrative centre) by road.

References 

Rural localities in Pervomaysky District, Altai Krai